Artemisinic aldehyde Delta11(13)-reductase (Dbr2) is an enzyme with systematic name artemisinic aldehyde:NADP+ oxidoreductase. This enzyme catalyses the following chemical reaction

 (11R)-dihydroartemisinic aldehyde + NADP+  artemisinic aldehyde + NADPH + H+

This enzyme i present in Artemisia annua.

References

External links 
 

EC 1.3.1